Ruggiero Torelli (7 June 1884, in Naples – 9 September 1915) was an Italian mathematician who introduced Torelli's theorem.

Publications

See also
Torelli group

References

External links 

Biography
Biography in Italian

Italian mathematicians